Juma Abdul Mnyamani (born 10 November 1992) is a Tanzanian football defender who plays for Young Africans.

References

1992 births
Living people
Tanzanian footballers
Tanzania international footballers
Mtibwa Sugar F.C. players
Young Africans S.C. players
Association football defenders
Tanzanian Premier League players